Maboula "Ali" Lukunku (born 14 April 1976) is a Congolese former professional footballer who played as a striker.

Career
Born in Kinshasa, Lukunku moved with his family to Italy at an early age before they settled in Grenoble, France. He had success playing in the Belgian Pro League with Standard de Liège.

References

External links
 Profile at Turkish Football Federation

1976 births
Living people
Footballers from Kinshasa
Association football forwards
Democratic Republic of the Congo footballers
Democratic Republic of the Congo international footballers
Belgian Pro League players
Ligue 1 players
Süper Lig players
3. Liga players
ASOA Valence players
AS Monaco FC players
Standard Liège players
Galatasaray S.K. footballers
Lille OSC players
K.A.A. Gent players
R.A.E.C. Mons players
FC Erzgebirge Aue players
Democratic Republic of the Congo expatriate footballers
Democratic Republic of the Congo expatriate sportspeople in France
Democratic Republic of the Congo expatriate sportspeople in Turkey
Democratic Republic of the Congo expatriate sportspeople in Belgium
Expatriate footballers in France
Expatriate footballers in Turkey
Expatriate footballers in Belgium
21st-century Democratic Republic of the Congo people